Marcellus E. Thomas Jr. (November 15, 1917 - November 22, 1982) was a baseball left fielder in the Negro leagues. He played with the St. Louis Stars in 1937.

References

External links
 and Seamheads

St. Louis Stars (1937) players
1917 births
1982 deaths
Baseball outfielders
Baseball players from Arkansas
20th-century African-American sportspeople